Ewald Stefan Janusz (13 December 1940 in Czechowice-Dziedzice – 9 June 2017) was a Polish sprint canoer who competed in the late 1960s. He finished eighth in the K-4 1000 m event at the 1968 Summer Olympics in Mexico City.

References
 Sports-reference.com profile
 Obituary at Polish Kayak Association

1940 births
2017 deaths
Canoeists at the 1968 Summer Olympics
Polish male canoeists
Olympic canoeists of Poland
People from Czechowice-Dziedzice
Sportspeople from Silesian Voivodeship